"The Hostess with the Mostes" was an American television play broadcast live on March 21, 1957, as part of the CBS television series, Playhouse 90. It was the 25th episode of the first season. Shirley Booth played the part of socialite Perle Mesta.

Plot
The play tells the story of socialite Perle Mesta, who was known for her lavish society parties. She grew up in Oklahoma, married the president of a steel company, and served as the U.S. Ambassador to Luxembourg. She was also the inspiration for Irving Berlin's musical Call Me Madam.

Cast
The cast included performances by:

 Shirley Booth as Perle Mesta
 Hedda Hopper as Maizie Weldon
 Perle Mesta as Herself
 Shepperd Strudwick as Charley Potter
 Robert Lowery as George Mesta
 Frank Milan as Philip Caldwell
 Joan Wetmore as Emily Caldwell
 Louise Beavers as Mattie Mae
 Peter Votrian as Mac
 Evelyn Rudie as Young Perle
 Fred Essler as Professor Froelich
 Emily Lawrence as Reverend Mother
 Caren Lenay as Countess Bellefonte
 Carol Veazie as Mrs. Kreeger
 Howard Wendell as Senator Kreeger
 Edgar Barrier as Count Bellefonte
 Lewis Martin as Mr. MacBride
 Peter Brocco as French Chef
 Paul Millard as Mr. Forbes
 James Gavin as Mr. Skirvin
 Werner Klemperer as Mr. Kolosoff
 Helen Hatch as Sister Euprasia
 Mavis Neal as Nurse
 Tony Romano as The Guitarist

Perle Mesta hosted and narrated the broadcast.

Production
Martin Manulis was the producer. Paul Nickell directed. The teleplay was written by Speed Lamkin and Hagar Wilde. Albert Heschong was the art director.

Reception
In The New York Times, Jack Gould called it "a bewildering bouillabaisse of cliche and corn" and proclaimed: "Unreservedly, it was the worstes'."

Jack O'Brian of the International News Service called it "a long, friendly, slow, patient explanation of Perle Mesta, virtually a 90-minute commercial setting the record straight through Mrs. Mesta's rose-colored memory."

References

1957 American television episodes
Playhouse 90 (season 1) episodes
1957 television plays